First and Last or The First and the Last or First & Last may refer to:
First and Last (album), an album by Glenn Spearman
The First and the Last (play), a play by John Galsworthy
The First and Last, an album by New Race
Skynyrd's First and... Last, an album by Lynyrd Skynyrd
First and Last, a 1989 UK television movie starring Joss Ackland
The First and the Last, a memoir by Adolf Galland
First & Last, a British television game show presented by Jason Manford

See also
Alpha and Omega
First and Last and Always, an album by the Sisters of Mercy
"First and Last Waltz", a song by Nickel Creek from Why Should the Fire Die?
Last and First (disambiguation)
The Beginning and the End (disambiguation)